Carabanchel is a station on Line 5 of the Madrid Metro. It is located in fare Zone A.

References 

Line 5 (Madrid Metro) stations
Railway stations in Spain opened in 1961